Dragan Labović (born April 20, 1987) is a Serbian former professional basketball player who last played for BC Nokia of the Finnish Korisliiga. He also represented the Serbian national basketball team internationally. He is a 2.07 m (6 ft 10 in) tall power forward.

Professional career
Labović grew up with KK Zdravlje from Leskovac. In 2002 he moved to juniors of FMP. He made his debut for the first team during the 2003–04 season, and in next two years he played a couple games for first team.

For the 2005–06 season he was loaned to KK Borac Čačak where he had minutes to play and chance to improve himself. In 2006 he was invited to play at Nike Hoop Summit in Memphis, Tennessee.
After one season at loan he goes back to FMP. With FMP he won the 2007 Serbian Cup. He was the top scorer of the 2008–09 season of the Adriatic League, averaging 18 points per game.

On January 3, 2010, he signed with the Greek club Aris. He played only three league games and four Eurocup games, and in March 2010, he moved to Skyliners Frankfurt for the rest of the season.

The 2010–11 season he played with BC Enisey. For the next season he moved to Krasnye Krylia. In June 2012, he signed a two–year contract with Nizhny Novgorod. He left Nizhny after one season.

In November 2013, he signed with the Polish club AZS Koszalin. He left the club in January 2014, because of family reasons. On January 31, 2014, he signed with Aliağa Petkim of the Turkish Basketball League. He left them in April 2014. 
Later that month he entered the Lebanese League signing with Al Riyadi Club. He left Al Riyadi in May 2014 after playing only two games.

In July 2014, he signed a one-year contract with the Romanian team CSU Asesoft Ploiești. In February 2015, he left Asesoft. In 12 league games he averaged 10.7 points per game. He also played 15 games in Eurocup where he had 8.3 points per game.

In October 2015, he signed with the Turkish club İstanbul BB. He left Istanbul after appearing in four games. In December 2015, he signed with the Finnish club BC Nokia for the rest of the season.

On July 7, 2016, Labović signed with Macedonian club Karpoš Sokoli for the 2016–17 season. On June 19, 2017, he re-signed with Karpoš Sokoli for one more season. On December 1, 2017, he left Karpoš Sokoli and signed with his former club BC Nokia.

Serbian national team

Youth level
Labović won the gold medal at the 2003 FIBA Europe Under-16 Championship and the 2005 FIBA Europe Under-18 Championship. He was MVP at 2005 FIBA Europe Under-18 Championship. He was part of the younger generation in the national teams did not lose a single match at official matches, and there he was one of the best players in that generation with Milenko Tepić and Miloš Teodosić.

Full squad
Labović made the Serbian national basketball team under head coach Moka Slavnić for the EuroBasket 2007.

Controversial 2012 press release about Dušan Ivković
During summer 2012, head coach Dušan Ivković included Labović on the preliminary list of players for the EuroBasket 2013 qualifying, but the 25-year-old power forward who had spent the preceding club season with BC Krasnye Krylia from Samara didn't make the final cut.

Commenting his decision to exclude Labović, Ivković reportedly stated that "Labović has been having issues with his weight as he recently became a father and probably celebrated a little too much".

Stung by Ivković's comment, Labović responded months later, in September 2012, by putting out a bitter, somewhat cryptic, and highly unusual press release published by Serbian sports media outlets. Though Ivković's comments had been made months earlier, Labović's press release came following the completion of the EuroBasket qualifying cycle in which Serbia barely qualified on basket difference despite being in what most considered to be an easy qualifying group alongside Montenegro, Israel, Estonia, Iceland, and Slovakia.

In the release, Labović criticizes 68-year-old Ivković's professional integrity and coaching skills, accusing the famous coach of letting his agent Miško Ražnatović of the BeoBasket agency exert an undue influence when it comes to squad selection for the national team. Among other things, addressing Ivković directly, Labović said: 

A few weeks after his press release, Labović's club BC Nizhny Novgorod led by a Serbian head coach Zoran Lukić, reprimanded the player although his punishment was not specified.

Personal
On 19 July 2019, Labović was detained by police for public disturbance. The incident occurred at a pool party in the Belgrade suburb of Ovča where reportedly inebriated Labović began smashing bottles and verbally menacing the property's owner, identified in the Serbian press reports as Lazar M., who eventually called the police. After being kept for 12 hours at a Borča police station in order to sober up, Labović had a misdemeanour investigation request (prekršajna prijava) filed against him.

Labović was arrested in the Belgrade suburb of Železnik on 7 December 2021 in the immediate aftermath of an incident that reportedly saw him assault a taxi driver and drive off with his vehicle. The altercation reportedly began when Labović—while getting into the said taxi—took issue with the driver's request to have a seat in the back of the car in accordance with COVID-19 epidemiological measures.

See also 
 List of Serbia men's national basketball team players

References

External links

 Dragan Labović at aba-liga.com
 Dragan Labović at eurobasket.com
 Dragan Labović at euroleague.net
 Dragan Labović at fiba.com

1987 births
Living people
ABA League players
Aliağa Petkim basketball players
Aris B.C. players
AZS Koszalin players
Basketball League of Serbia players
BC Enisey players
BC Krasnye Krylia players
BC Nizhny Novgorod players
BC Nokia players
CSU Asesoft Ploiești players
İstanbul Büyükşehir Belediyespor basketball players
KK Borac Čačak players
KK FMP (1991–2011) players
People from Prokuplje
Power forwards (basketball)
Serbia men's national basketball team players
Serbian expatriate basketball people in Finland
Serbian expatriate basketball people in Germany
Serbian expatriate basketball people in Lebanon
Serbian expatriate basketball people in Poland
Serbian expatriate basketball people in North Macedonia
Serbian expatriate basketball people in Romania
Serbian expatriate basketball people in Russia
Serbian expatriate basketball people in Turkey
Serbian men's basketball players
Skyliners Frankfurt players
Al Riyadi Club Beirut basketball players